The Technological Innovation and Cooperation for Foreign Information Access (TICFIA) grant program is a United States Department of Education Title VI grant program that provides grants to develop innovative techniques or programs that address national teaching and research needs in international education and foreign languages by using technology to access, collect, organize, preserve, and widely disseminate information on world regions and countries other than the United States.

External links
Department of Education page on TICFIA
Collaborative page by TICFIA Grantees and earlier version
2010 TICFIA Conference Wiki

References 

United States Department of Education
Digital library projects